Guo Hua (born 30 July 1971) is a Chinese former professional snooker player.

Career
The best result Guo Hua had was reaching the last 32 in the 1994 Thailand Open. In the round of wild cards, he defeated Dave Finbow 5–3, before losing 2–5 to Neal Foulds.

In 2018 he played in the Shanghai Masters tournament as a wildcard, losing in the opening round against Neil Robertson.

Performance and rankings timeline

References 

1971 births
Living people
Chinese snooker players
Cue sports players at the 1998 Asian Games
Asian Games competitors for China
20th-century Chinese people